Kathryn Alexandra Flett (born 1 April 1964) is a British TV critic, author, and star of the BBC's Grumpy Old Women series.

Early life
Daughter of songwriter Douglas J. Flett and Patricia (née Jenkins), she was educated at Notting Hill & Ealing High School, and Hammersmith and West London College. At the age of 16, by which time her parents had been divorced for seven years, Flett's mother "flattered [her] into thinking [she] was so grown-up and on top of things that [she] didn’t really need any hands-on mothering any more", sending her to live with her father, whilst her mother returned to her native Australia with the man who would become Flett's stepfather, Arthur. Flett has remained largely estranged from her mother since this time.

Career
Flett began her career as a staff writer for i-D Magazine in 1985. This was followed by a period as features editor and fashion editor of The Face (1987-1989), three years as a freelancer, and then editor of Arena magazine from 1992–1995.

In 1995, at the age of 31, Flett joined The Observer as associate editor of the magazine Observer Life, later becoming a features writer and TV critic on the newspaper.

In 1997, Flett's husband of just 17 months had just left her and the couple were going through a messy divorce. Flett found an outlet for her grief by writing about the break-up in gory detail, week-by-week, in her Observer newspaper column. She published a book about the relationship, The Heart-shaped Bullet in 1999.

Since 2004, Flett has starred in the BBC TV's Grumpy Old Women series and, in 2008, was a judge on Channel 4's Miss Naked Beauty. Her first novel, Separate Lives, was published July 2012 by Quercus Books. Her latest book "Outstanding" was published in April 2016 by Quercus books.

Flett was given an honorary M.Litt by the University of Brighton in 2015.

In April 2016, Flett began writing a fortnightly restaurant review column in The Daily Telegraph.

References

Sources 
Observer biog
Amazon review
Miss Naked Beauty profile

External links 

Official website for Kathryn Flett's novel Separate Lives

1964 births
English journalists
English television critics
English television personalities
Living people
People educated at Notting Hill & Ealing High School
The Observer people